H&E stain is a tissue stain used in histology.

H&E may also refer to:

Magazines 
H&E naturist, a monthly British magazine focusing on the naturist lifestyle

Companies 
H&E Paramotores, a Spanish paramotor manufacturer

Aircraft 
H&E Paramotores Corsario
H&E Paramotores Simonini
H&E Paramotores Solo
H&E Paramotores Ziklon